Follow may refer to:

Follow (album), the third album by Pakho Chau
Follow (dancer), one member of a partner dance
"Follow", a song by Jerry Merrick, popularized by Richie Havens on his 1966 album Mixed Bag
"Follow", a song by Drowning Pool from their 2001 album Sinner
"Follow", a song by Breaking Benjamin and is the fourth single from their 2004 album We Are Not Alone
"Follow", a song by All That Remains from the 2002 album Behind Silence and Solitude
"Follow", a song by Jeff Watson from the 1993 album Around the Sun
Following, a feature used by many forms of social media
Followed (film), a 2018 suspense film

See also
 Fallow (disambiguation)
 "Follow Follow"
 Follows
 Follower (disambiguation)
 Following (disambiguation)